Vredehoek (Afrikaans: "corner of peace" or "peace corner") is a suburb of Cape Town, South Africa located in the City Bowl, on the slopes of Table Mountain, between Devil's Peak Estate and Oranjezicht.  The suburb was proclaimed after the first world war and immigrants from many European countries settled here after peace was declared. It is popular among dual income households yet to have children, and the suburb has been going through an urban revival as older blocks of flats are being replaced with high-quality apartments.

The area has an established Neighbourhood Watch community known as DPV, which includes the adjacent suburb of Devil's Peak Estate.

There are a series of community amenities such as parks, restaurants, cafes, a library and access to walking trails on the Table Mountain for the public in Vredehoek. For grocery shopping most people will visit the Gardens Centre Shopping Mall in neighbouring suburb of Gardens or the Kwikspar on Derry street.

See also
 Disa Park

References

External links
 A collection of images of Art-Deco style blocks of flats in Vredehoek
 2001 Census statistics for Vredehoek

Suburbs of Cape Town